Toson may refer to:
 Tōson Shimazaki (1872-1943), a Japanese author
 Tosǒn (826-898), also romanized as Doseon, a Korean Buddhist monk and geomancer
 Tahani Toson (born 1971), Egyptian volleyball player